Reynold Arthur Clarey (15 March 1897 – 9 May 1972) was an Australian politician.

Born in South Yarra to estate agent Francis William Clarey and Catherine Lawson (his half-brother Percy would also go on to be a prominent politician and unionist), Arthur attended Flemington State School, Melbourne High School and Melbourne University, graduating with a Bachelor of Commerce. He was employed as a clerk with the Victorian Public Service from 1913 to 1920 and with BHP from 1920 to 1947. On 23 September 1940 he married Irene Mary Leech, who died in 1957; he remarried on 1 July 1958 Doris Jane McGinnis, née Blythe. Clarey joined the Labor Party in 1932, and was later president of the Clerks' Union. In 1955 he was elected to the Victorian Legislative Assembly for Melbourne. He was the auditor of the state branch from 1955 to 1970 and the parliamentary treasury spokesman from 1967 to 1970. He died in 1972 at Fitzroy.

References

1897 births
1972 deaths
Australian public servants
Members of the Victorian Legislative Assembly
Politicians from Melbourne
University of Melbourne alumni
Australian trade unionists
Clerks
Australian Labor Party members of the Parliament of Victoria
20th-century Australian politicians
People from South Yarra, Victoria
20th-century Australian businesspeople
Businesspeople from Melbourne